Sarxanbəyli (also, Sərxanbəyli, Sarkhan-Beyli, and Sarykhanbeyli) is a village and municipality in the Sabirabad Rayon of Azerbaijan. It has a population of 1,637.

References 

Populated places in Sabirabad District